La Cuarta Hoja  is the sixth studio album by Spanish singer-songwriter Pablo Alborán. It was released by Warner Music Spain on 2 December 2022.

Chart performance
La Cuarta Hoja became Alborán's sixth consecutive studio album to top the Spanish Albums Chart. It has since been certified gold by the Productores de Música de España (Promusicae).

Track listing

Charts

Weekly charts

Year-end charts

Certifications

Release history

References 

 
2022 albums
Pablo Alborán albums